Francella Ruby Turner MBE (born 22 June 1958) is a British Jamaican R&B and soul singer, songwriter, and actress.

In a music career spanning more than 30 years, Turner is best known for her album and single releases in Europe and North America. She is also known for her work as a session backing vocalist, with artists including Bryan Ferry, UB40, Steel Pulse, Steve Winwood, Jools Holland, and Mick Jagger. She has also written songs that have been covered by musicians including Lulu, Yazz and Maxi Priest.

Turner achieved the rare feat, for a British singer, of reaching #1 on the US R&B chart, with "It's Gonna Be Alright" in February 1990. Between 1986–1995, eight of her singles appeared in the UK Singles Chart with "I'd Rather Go Blind" being the most successful, reaching #24 in 1987. Turner performed at the Birmingham Heart Beat 86 concert, which featured George Harrison, and also has sung on BBC Television's Jools' Annual Hootenanny, from 2007–2023 inclusive. She has also appeared as an actress on stage, film and television.

Biography

Early years
Ruby Turner was born in Montego Bay, Jamaica, and moved at the age of nine with her family to Handsworth, Birmingham, England, in 1967.

Turner came from a musical family as her grandfather sang the lead in one of Jamaica's gospel groups. In the early 1980s, she worked with Culture Club at the height of their popularity. She received an offer of a solo recording contract soon afterwards and signed to Jive Records, part of the Zomba Group.

Music career
Turner achieved her solo recording contract with Jive Records after singing backing vocals on Culture Club's From Luxury to Heartache. She released four albums and a "Best of" Compilation Album over the next few years. Her first solo album Women Hold Up Half the Sky, was released in 1986 to critical acclaim and produced hit singles such as a cover version of the Staple Singers song "If You're Ready (Come Go with Me)", a duet with Jonathan Butler, and the Etta James standard "I'd Rather Go Blind".

In March 1987, Turner sang on the Ferry Aid single, "Let It Be". Around this time she also released the album The Motown Songbook, on which she performed with Motown and others, including the Four Tops, the Temptations and Jimmy Ruffin. In 1988, Turner appeared on Corey Hart's album, Young Man Running on the duet "Spot You in a Coalmine".

Turner achieved a no. 1 R&B chart success in the US in February 1990 with "It's Gonna Be Alright", becoming one of the few British artists to top that chart. Four other US R&B chart entries followed in 1990 and 1991, including "Paradise" from the movie Dancin' Thru the Dark.

In 1998, she recorded the album Call Me by My Name with British rhythm and blues veterans Boz Burrell, Zoot Money, Bobby Tench and Stan Webb. On New Year's Eve 1999, she sang the National Anthem for Queen Elizabeth II, who was accompanied by Prime minister Tony Blair and other dignitaries at the opening of the Millennium Dome, in London.

Turner sang backing vocals on Mick Jagger's 2001 album, Goddess in the Doorway, and performed "Nobody But You" on the 2002 album Jools Holland's Big Band Rhythm & Blues. In 2007, Turner presented a documentary Shout Sister Shout about Sister Rosetta Tharpe for BBC Radio 2. She sang on Seasick Steve's album, I Started Out with Nothin and I Still Got Most of It Left (2008). In September 2009, Turner released her first gospel music album, I'm Travelling On. Her rendition of "Jesus on the Mainline" appears on a compilation CD that accompanied the book British Black Gospel by Steve Alexander Smith.

On 28 October 2009 Turner was presented with a BASCA Gold Badge Award in recognition of her unique contribution to music.

On 4 June 2012, Turner was one of the performers at the Diamond Jubilee Concert outside Buckingham Palace in London, where she joined Jools Holland on stage. 

On 4 June 2022, Turner performed Climb Ev'ry Mountain with Mica Paris and Nicola Roberts at the Platinum Party at the Palace concert to celebrate the Platinum Jubilee of Queen Elizabeth II.

Turner was awarded an MBE in the 2016 Birthday Honours for services to music.

Acting
As an actress, Turner has appeared in productions of A Streetcar Named Desire, Carmen Jones, and Fame.  She has also appeared in One Love, by Kwame Davies, at the London's Lyric Theatre, Hammersmith. She appeared in a successful run in the London West End production of the musical Simply Heavenly, which was nominated for 'Outstanding Musical' at the 2005 Laurence Olivier Awards.

Turner has appeared in a number of films, including Love Actually (2003), Reggae Britannia (2011) and Famous Fred (1996). In 2006 Turner made an appearance in Little Britain Abroad, where she played the Sheriff Judy. On 12 October 2007, she appeared as a guest star (as herself) in the BBC One soap opera Doctors. The episode title was entitled "Raising The Roof". In 2009, Turner appeared in the BBC drama Hotel Babylon.

In 2011, Turner narrated the BBC Four documentary Reggae Britannia, which chronicled the history of British reggae music. In 2012, Turner, along with Ralph Allwood and Manvinder Rattan, was a judge on the BBC Two series The Choir: Sing While You Work. In 2013, Turner was a guest judge on the BBC Songs of Praise gospel choir competition. In 2015, it was announced that she would appear as Mrs. Blip in the made-for-TV movie The Land of Sometimes.

Personal life
Turner has been engaged twice, but not married and has said "Many women I know, must have a man in their life. ... They seem programmed to find a man and must get married. Marriage is a priority for them. Not for me. I am not built that way. I have never felt I had to have a man in my life, or have to end up married."

Her parents are separated and her father lives in the US. Her mother Violetta lives near Turner and sang on her 2009 album I'm Travelling On.

Discography

Albums

Singles

See also
R&B number-one hits of 1990 (USA)
List of artists who reached number one on the Billboard R&B chart
List of performers on Top of the Pops

References

External links

Ruby Turner - official YouTube channel
Ruby Turner interview by Pete Lewis, Blues & Soul, July 2009

[ Ruby Turner] at AllMusic
An interview with Ruby Turner at Soul Express in December 2014
 

1958 births
Living people
Jamaican emigrants to the United Kingdom
21st-century Black British women singers
British soul singers
British film actresses
British stage actresses
British television actresses
British songwriters
20th-century Black British women singers
People from Montego Bay
Musicians from Birmingham, West Midlands
Members of the Order of the British Empire
People from Handsworth, West Midlands
Jools Holland's Rhythm and Blues Orchestra members